Andrés Eduardo Mata Pérez (born 11 November 1992 in Valencia, Carabobo, Venezuela) is a Venezuelan-born Spanish weightlifter competing in the 81 kg category. He competed at the 2012, 2016 Summer Olympics and 2020 Summer Olympics.

References

External links 
 

Spanish male weightlifters
1992 births
Living people
Weightlifters at the 2012 Summer Olympics
Weightlifters at the 2016 Summer Olympics
Olympic weightlifters of Spain
People from Valencia, Venezuela
Mediterranean Games silver medalists for Spain
Mediterranean Games medalists in weightlifting
Competitors at the 2018 Mediterranean Games
European Weightlifting Championships medalists
Weightlifters at the 2020 Summer Olympics
21st-century Spanish people
21st-century Venezuelan people